{{Infobox kommune
|name                   = Oppland
|fylke                  = yes
|former                 = yes
|native_name            = 
|native_name_lang       = 
|other_name             = 
|official_name          = 
|image_skyline          = From_the_top_osf_Surtningssua_looking_south_-_panoramio.jpg
|image_caption          = Oppland mountains
|idnumber               = 05
|county                 = Oppland
|district               = Eastern Norway
|capital                = Lillehammer
|established            = 1781
|preceded               = Oplandenes amt
|disestablished         = 1 Jan 2020
|succeeded              = Innlandet county
|demonym                = Opplending
|language               = Neutral
|coatofarms             = 
|flag                   = 
|webpage                = 
|county_mayor           = Even Aleksander Hagen
|county_mayor_party     = 
|county_mayor_as_of     = 2015-2019
|governor               = Christl Kvam 
|governor_party         = 
|governor_as_of         = 2015-2019
|area_rank              = 
|area_total_km2         = 25192
|area_land_km2          = 23787
|area_water_km2         = 1405
|area_water_percent     = 5.6
|population_as_of       = 30 September 2019
|population_rank        = 
|population_total       = 189,437
|population_density_km2 = auto
|population_increase    = 0.2
|income_per_capita      = 133,600
|income_year            = 2001
|GDP                    = 193,130
|GDP_year               = 2001
|GDP_rank               = 13
|GDP_rank_percent       = 2.32
|coordinates            = 
|module={{Historical populations
|footnote = Source: Statistics Norway.
|shading = off
|width=100%
|1951|160496 	 			  	 	  	  	  	 	  	  	  	  		  	  	  	  	  	
|1961|166303	 	  	  	  	  	  	  	  	  	  	  	  	  	
|1971|172479 	  	  	  	 	 	  	  	  	 	  	    	  	  	  	  	  	
|1981|180765 	 	 	  	  	  	  	  	  	  	 	  	  	  	  	  	  	  	  	  	 	
|1991|182593  	  	  	  	  	  	  	  	  	 	  	  	  	  	  	
|2001|183419 	 	  	  	  	  	  	  	  	  	  	 	  	  	  	  	  	 	  	  	  	
|2011|186087
}}

}}

Oppland  is a former county in Norway which existed from 1781 until its dissolution on 1 January 2020. The old Oppland county bordered the counties of Trøndelag, Møre og Romsdal, Sogn og Fjordane, Buskerud, Akershus, Oslo and Hedmark. The county administration was located in the town of Lillehammer.

Merger
On 1 January 2020, the neighboring counties of Oppland and Hedmark were merged to form the new Innlandet county. Both Oppland and Hedmark were the only landlocked counties of Norway, and the new Innlandet county is the only landlocked county in Norway. The two counties had historically been one county that was divided in 1781. Historically, the region was commonly known as "Opplandene". In 1781, the government split the area into two: Hedemarkens amt and Kristians amt (later renamed Hedmark and Oppland. In 2017, the government approved the merger of the two counties. There were several names debated, but the government settled on Innlandet. 

Geography
Oppland extended from the lakes Mjøsa and Randsfjorden to the mountains Dovrefjell, Jotunheimen and Rondane. Gråhøe is a mountain on the border between the municipalities of Sel and Dovre in Oppland.

The county was conventionally divided into traditional districts. These are the Gudbrandsdalen, Valdres, Toten, Hadeland and Land. Oppland included the towns Lillehammer, Gjøvik, Otta, and Fagernes, and Norway's two highest mountains, Glittertind and Galdhøpiggen, Valdres and the Gudbrand Valley being popular attractions. The Gudbrand Valley surrounds the river Gudbrandsdalslågen, and includes the area extending from Jotunheimen down to Bagn at Begna River. It is a well known place for skiing and winter sports. The main population centres in this area were Beitostølen and Fagernes. Eight of the ten highest mountains in Norway are located in the western part of Oppland.

Etymology
In Norse times the inner parts of Norway were called Upplǫnd which means 'the upper countries'. The first element is upp which means 'upper'. The last element is lǫnd which is the plural form of 'land'.

In 1757 the inner parts of the great Akershus amt were separated, and given the name Oplandenes Amt. This was divided in 1781 into Christians Amt (named after the king Christian VII) and Hedemarkens Amt. The name/form was changed to Kristians Amt in 1877 after an official spelling reform that changed ch to k (see also Kristiania, Kristiansand and Kristiansund). In 1919, the name Kristians Amt was changed (back) to Opland fylke, and the spelling Oppland was approved in 1950.

Coat of arms
The coat of arms was granted in 1989, and it showed two Pulsatilla vernalis''.

Municipalities

Oppland County (Christians Amt) had a total of 26 municipalities:

Districts

 Begnadalen
 Espedalen
 Gudbrandsdalen
 Hadeland
 Heidal
 Hunndalen
 Land
 Toten
 Valdres
 Vestoppland

Cities

 Gjøvik
 Lillehammer
 Fagernes
 Otta
 Vinstra

Parishes

 Aulstad
 Aurdal
 Austsinni
 Bagn
 Balke
 Begndal
 Biri
 Brandbu (Nes)
 Bruflat
 Bøverdal
 Dovre
 Eina
 Etnedal
 Fluberg
 Follebu (Folleboe)
 Fåberg
 Fåvang (Fodevang)
 Garmo
 Gausdal
 Gjøvik
 Gran
 Hedal
 Hegge
 Heidal
 Hoff
 Hunn
 Hurum
 Høre
 Jevnaker
 Kolbu
 Kvam
 Kvikne (Quiekne)
 Land
 Lesja (Læssø)
 Lesjaskog
 Lillehammer
 Lom
 Lomen (Røn, Røen)
 Lunner
 Mesna
 Nes (Brandbu)
 Nord-Aurdal
 Nord-Fron
 Nordberg
 Nordre Etnedal
 Nordre Land
 Nordsinni (Hogner)
 Nykirke
 Reinli
 Ringebu
 Rogne
 Røn (Røen)
 Saksumdal
 Sel
 Sister
 Skiåker
 Skjåk
 Skrautvål
 Slidredomen
 Snertingdal
 St. Mary
 St. Thomas
 Strand
 Svatsum
 Svenes
 Sødorp (Søthorp)
 Søndre Land
 Sør-Aurdal
 Sør-Fron
 Tingelstad
 Torpa
 Tretten (Trøtten)
 Ulnes
 Vang
 Vardal
 Venabygd
 Vestre Gausdal
 Vestre Slidre
 Vestre Toten
 Volbu
 Vågå
 Østre Gausdal
 Østre Slidre
 Østre Toten
 Østsinni (Gårder)
 Øye (Øie)
 Øyer
 Åmot
 Ås

Villages

 Aurdal
 Bagn
 Begna
 Beitostølen
 Bismo
 Biri
 Bjoneroa
 Bjorli
 Bjølstad
 Bjørgo
 Brandbu
 Brekkom
 Bruflat
 Bybrua
 Bøverbru
 Dale
 Dokka
 Dombås
 Dovre
 Egge
 Eina
 Fagernes
 Fluberg
 Follebu
 Forset
 Fåberg
 Fåvang
 Grotli
 Grua
 Harestua
 Harpefoss
 Hjerkinn
 Hov
 Høvringen
 Jaren
 Jevnaker
 Kapp
 Kolbu
 Kvam
 Lalm
 Leira
 Lena
 Lensbygda
 Lesjaskog
 Lesjaverk
 Lora
 Moane
 Nordlia
 Odnes
 Raufoss
 Reinsvoll
 Ringstad
 Røn
 Sandbumoen
 Segalstad bru
 Skogbygda
 Skrautvål
 Skreia
 Skåbu
 Sletta
 Slidre
 Snertingdal
 Svingvoll
 Tretten
 Tyinkrysset
 Vang i Valdres
 Vinstra
 Vågåmo

Former municipalities

 Biri (Birid)
 Brandbu
 Eina
 Fluberg
 Fron
 Fåberg (Faabeg)
 Heidal
 Kolbu
 Land
 Slidre
 Snertingdal
 Torpa
 Vardal
 Vestre Gausdal
 Østre Gausdal

See also
Høgbrothøgdi
Røykeskardhøi

References

External links

 
Former counties of Norway
History of Innlandet
2020 disestablishments in Norway
Petty kingdoms of Norway
Populated places disestablished in 2020
States and territories disestablished in 2020